Automated Customer Account Transfer Service (commonly known as ACATS) is an almost entirely electronic system in the United States that executes the transfer of financial securities from a trading account at one institution to the trading account at another. ACATS was developed by the National Securities Clearing Corporation (NSCC), now a subsidiary of Depository Trust & Clearing Corporation (DTCC), a private holding company owned collectively by banks and financial institutions that handles the settlement of the vast majority of securities transactions in the United States.

References

Financial software